Linda Niemantsverdriet (born 10 December 1974) is a Dutch former professional tennis player.

Niemantsverdriet, who at the age of 15 became the youngest Dutchwoman to win the senior national title, was a member of her country's World Youth Cup winning team in 1990. She turned professional in 1992 after graduating from high school.

On the WTA Tour, Niemantsverdriet had her best performance at the 1993 Indonesian Open, where she made it through to the quarterfinals. In 1994 she won a match in Tokyo against Yayuk Basuki, then the world's 35th ranked player.

ITF finals

Singles: 6 (5–1)

Doubles (5–1)

References

External links
 
 

1974 births
Living people
Dutch female tennis players
20th-century Dutch women
21st-century Dutch women